Gutta Bapineedu Chowdary (22 September 1936 – 11 February 2019), better known as Vijaya Bapineedu, was an Indian film screenwriter and director, known for his works predominantly in Telugu Cinema. He started his career as a magazine editor and later directed Maga Maharaju (1983), Gang Leader (1991), and Magadheerudu (1986).

Personal life
Bapineedu was born on 22 September 1936 to Seetha Ramaswamy and Leelavathy in the village of Chataparru near Eluru. He graduated with a B.A. in Mathematics from C.R.R. College in Eluru. Prior to film making he served as an editor for an entertainment magazine Vijaya.

Death
Vijaya Bapineedu died from Alzheimer's disease at his residence in Hyderabad on 11 February 2019; he was 82.

Filmography

Director
 Dabbu Dabbu Dabbu (1981)
 Maga Maharaju (1983)
 Mahanagaramlo Mayagadu (1984)
 Hero (1984)
 Bharyamani (1984)
 Maharaju (1985)
 Krishnagaradi (1985)
 Dongallo Dora (1985)
 Magadheerudu (1986)
 Naku Pellam Kavali (1987)
 Khaidi No.786 (1988)
 Donga Kollu (1988)
 Maharajasri Mayagaadu (1988)
 Sumangali (1989)
 Zoo Laka Taka (1989)
 Mahajananiki Maradalu Pilla (1990)
 Gang Leader (1991)
 Valu Jada Tolu Beltu (1992)
 Seetapathi Chalo Tirupathi (1992)
 Big Boss (1995)
 Family (1996)
 Kodukulu (1998)

Producer
 Yavvanam Katesindi (1976)

References

External links
 

1936 births
Telugu film directors
Film directors from Andhra Pradesh
Telugu film producers
2019 deaths
Film producers from Andhra Pradesh
People from West Godavari district
People from Eluru
20th-century Indian film directors
Screenwriters from Andhra Pradesh
Telugu screenwriters
Neurological disease deaths in India
Deaths from Alzheimer's disease